The Andean teal (Anas andium) is a South American species of duck. Like other teals, it belongs to the diverse genus Anas; more precisely it is one of the "true" teals of subgenus Nettion.  It is restricted to the Andean highlands of Colombia, Venezuela, and Ecuador.  It inhabits freshwater wetlands, preferring palustrine habitat to rivers. It is not considered threatened by the IUCN.

Taxonomy
Mitochondrial DNA sequence data is most similar to that of the very different-looking green-winged teal. Apart from the mystifying relationship with the red-and-green-headed teals, it altogether most resembles the Indian Ocean radiation of teals.

Traditionally, there are 2 subspecies:
 Mérida teal, Anas andium altipetens (Conover, 1941) – highlands of north-west Venezuela and adjacent parts of Colombia.
 nominate, Anas andium andium (Sclater & Salvin, 1873) - highlands of Colombia and Ecuador.

This species and the yellow-billed teal are sometimes considered conspecific under the name speckled teal (A. flavirostris), but increasingly taxonomists treat the two as distinct species. When split, the scientific name A. flavirostris is restricted to the yellow-billed teal.

Footnotes

References
 Accordi, Iury Almeida & Barcellos, André (2006): Composição da avifauna em oito áreas úmidas da Bacia Hidrográfica do Lago Guaíba, Rio Grande do Sul [Bird composition and conservation in eight wetlands of the hydrographic basin of Guaíba lake, State of Rio Grande do Sul, Brazil]. Revista Brasileira de Ornitologia 14(2): 101-115 [Portuguese with English abstract]. PDf fulltext
 Carboneras, Carles (1992): 77. Speckled Teal. In: del Hoyo, Josep; Elliott, Andrew & Sargatal, Jordi (eds.): Handbook of Birds of the World (Vol.1: Ostrich to Ducks): 603, plate 45. Lynx Edicions, Barcelona. 
 Johnson, Kevin P. & Sorenson, Michael D. (1999): Phylogeny and biogeography of dabbling ducks (genus Anas): a comparison of molecular and morphological evidence. Auk 116(3): 792–805. DjVu fulltext PDF fulltext
 Van Remsen (2008) Treat Anas andium as a separate species from Anas flavirostris. South American Classification Committee. Accessed 27-04-2008

Andean teal
Andean teal
Birds of the Andes
Birds of the Colombian Andes
Birds of the Venezuelan Andes
Birds of the Ecuadorian Andes
Andean teal
Taxa named by Philip Sclater
Taxa named by Osbert Salvin